Under My Skin is the third solo album by Stephen Pearcy, the founder, lead singer and songwriter of the rock band Ratt.  Featured on the album is the single "Round and Round (Featuring The Donnas)" which is a remake of the 1984 Ratt hit "Round and Round".  The album was released on July 22, 2008 by Top Fuel Records and Airline Records. The track "Are You Ready", like previous recordings "Drive With Me" and the rerecorded Arcade track "Hott Racin'", was heard on NHRA/ESPN 2.
A video was done for "You're A lot Like Me" and "In Outta Love" was chosen as a single.

Track listing
 "You're a Lot Like Me" – 2:38
 "Big Nothin'" - 3:31
 "Watcha Doin'" - 2:30
 "Time Slips Away" - 3:05
 "Under My Skin" - 3:26
 "In Outta Love" - 3:12
 "Here We Go Again" - 2:43
 "Bottoms Up" - 2:29
 "Are You Ready" - 3:08
 "Injector" - 2:30
 "Round and Round (Featuring The Donnas)" - 4:30

Stephen Pearcy albums
2008 albums